Russell Delmar Meredith (June 27, 1897 – March 22, 1989) was an American football guard in the National Football League (NFL) and politician. He played a single season with the Louisville Brecks and the Cleveland Bulldogs. He played college football and basketball at West Virginia. As a politician,, he served in the West Virginia House of Delegates from 1939–1942.

Meredith was also the head coach for Marshall's football, baseball, and men's basketball teams. In addition, he was the line coach at West Virginia and the head football coach at Salem College.

Head coaching record

Football

Basketball

Baseball

References

External links
 WVU Hall of Fame profile
 
 

1897 births
1989 deaths
20th-century American politicians
American football guards
American men's basketball players
Basketball coaches from West Virginia
Cleveland Bulldogs players
Coaches of American football from West Virginia
Fairmont Senior High School alumni
Louisville Brecks players
Marshall Thundering Herd baseball coaches
Marshall Thundering Herd football coaches
Marshall Thundering Herd men's basketball coaches
Democratic Party members of the West Virginia House of Delegates
Sportspeople from Fairmont, West Virginia
Players of American football from West Virginia
Salem Tigers football coaches
West Virginia Mountaineers football coaches
West Virginia Mountaineers football players
West Virginia Mountaineers men's basketball players